Matthew McChesney (born November 16, 1981 in Santa Cruz, California) is a former American football guard in the National Football League. He was signed by the St. Louis Rams as an undrafted free agent in 2005. He played college football at Colorado.

McChesney has also played for the New York Jets, Miami Dolphins and Denver Broncos.

Professional career

St. Louis Rams
McChesney was signed by the St. Louis Rams as an undrafted free agent in 2005.

New York Jets
The New York Jets converted McChesney from a defensive lineman to a guard in the 2008 offseason.

Miami Dolphins
On November 7, 2008, the Miami Dolphins signed McChesney off their practice squad.  He was placed on injured reserve on November 15 with a knee injury.  On February 10, 2009, the Dolphins waived McChesney.

Denver Broncos
On February 12, 2009, McChesney signed with the Denver Broncos.  He was placed on injured reserve on September 4.

Retirement
On May 20, 2010, McChesney announced his retirement from the NFL, following a freak golfing accident in April 2010.

References

External links
New York Jets bio

1981 births
Living people
Sportspeople from Santa Cruz, California
Players of American football from California
American football defensive tackles
American football offensive guards
Colorado Buffaloes football players
St. Louis Rams players
New York Jets players
Frankfurt Galaxy players
Miami Dolphins players
Denver Broncos players